Drown in Darkness – The Early Demos is a compilation album featuring the music of Paradise Lost from their demos made in 1988 and 1989. Tracks one through three is taken from the band's 1988 demo "Paradise Lost"; tracks four through six is taken from the band's 1989 demo "Frozen Illusion"; tracks seven through twelve is taken from the band's other 1989 demo "Plains of Desolation". There was a seven minute, twelve second trailer of this demo, where most of the band members behind the demos were interviewed concerning the demos and the time surrounding the recording and releasing of the demos.

Track listing
 "Drown in Darkness" – 4:38
 "Internal Torment" – 5:05
 "Morbid Existence" – 2:38
 "Paradise Lost" – 5:24
 "Internal Torment" – 5:40
 "Frozen Illusion" – 5:16
 "Internal Torment" (live) – 4:40
 "Our Saviour" (live) – 5:56
 "Plains of Desolation" (live) – 4:10
 "Drown in Darkness" (live) – 4:37
 "Paradise Lost" (live) – 5:34
 "Nuclear Abomination" (live) – 3:48

Personnel
Nick Holmes - vocals 
Gregor Mackintosh - guitars
Aaron Aedy - guitars
Steve Edmondson - bass
Matthew Archer - drums

References

2009 compilation albums
Paradise Lost (band) albums